Cariboo was one of the twelve original electoral districts created when British Columbia became a Canadian province in 1871. Roughly corresponding to the old colonial electoral administrative district of the same name, it was a three-member riding until the 1894 election, when it was reduced through reapportionment and became a two-member riding until the 1916 election, after which it has been a single-member riding. It produced many notable Members of the Legislative Assembly (MLAs), including George Anthony Boomer Walkem, third and fifth holder of the office of Premier of British Columbia and who was one of the first representatives elected from the riding; John Robson, ninth Premier of British Columbia; and Robert Bonner, a powerful minister in the W.A.C. Bennett cabinet, and later CEO of MacMillan Bloedel and BC Hydro.

Demographics

Political geography 
When the riding was created, the bulk of its population was in the Cariboo goldfields district around Barkerville, although its boundaries extended to the Yukon boundaries - the original Cariboo riding at its creation included all of the former New Caledonia fur district, north of those parts of it now in the Lillooet Land District which formed the Lillooet riding.1 As mining exploration and other settlement spread northwards from the Cariboo mining areas, the Omineca, Fort George and Peace River (British Columbia electoral district)|ridings were split off by the end of the 19th century, and the Cariboo riding was reduced to the Cariboo Plateau, south from Quesnel to just south of Williams Lake and 150 Mile House, and including the Barkerville, British Columbia region as well as the remote Chilcotin region, which had no voting (settler) population when the riding was formed other than isolated traders and trappers who may have had time or means to vote. Nearly all of the 785 voters in the first election were in the goldfield towns, Quesnel (then Quesnellemouthe), Williams Lake or towns and ranches south along the Cariboo Road and other routes of the era, and those along the West Fraser from the Chilcotin River, including the Gang Ranch south to just north of Big Bar, an isolated canyon ranching, river-crossing and wagon-trail town in the Fraser Canyon, which was in the Lillooet riding.

Following the construction of the Canadian Pacific Railway (CPR), increased settlement on the Cariboo Plateau south of the goldfields region shifted the population weight of the riding to that area, which was increasingly centred on the town of Williams Lake and the plateau between there and Kamloops, British Columbia. The southern Cariboo region, later added in a redistribution and division of the Cariboo riding into Cariboo South and Cariboo North, which exist today, was originally part of the Lillooet riding. The Lillooet and Cariboo provincial ridings combined formed the original definition of the Cariboo federal riding.

1 New Caledonia's southern boundary was vague, but it was generally accepted to include the Thompson area although its heartland is the Fort Saint James-Fraser Lake region northwest of Prince George.

Notable elections

First Nations
When the riding was created its boundaries stretched from the Quesnel Lake and Chilcotin areas, flanking the great plateau of central BC on its east and west, all the way north to the Yukon border. At that time, although irrelevant to the issue of electoral representation, the riding's population included members of the Shuswap, Carrier, Chilcotin, Sekani and other more northerly nations. As the riding was reduced to roughly correspond with the Cariboo district (excluding Lillooet-Ashcroft, which were in the Lillooet electoral district, at least until the mid-20th century) the native population became only Shuswap, along the Fraser and east of it, and the Chilcotin people, who lived to the west of it. First Nations people, even in the reduced riding area, mostly outnumbered the total figure for non-natives until the early 20th century, but were not allowed to vote or run for office.

Towns and industry

Major Communities

Notable MLAs 

 Alexander Edmund Batson Davie, became the eighth premier of British Columbia
 Alex Fraser, held the seat for 20 years

Electoral history 
Note: Winners of each election are in bold.

|-

|Independent
|Cornelius Booth
|align="right"|155
|align="right"|19.74%
|align="right"|
|align="right"|unknown

|Independent
|John Evans
|align="right"|107
|align="right"|13.63%
|align="right"|
|align="right"|unknown

|Independent
|Joseph Hunter
|align="right"|162
|align="right"|20.64%
|align="right"|
|align="right"|unknown

|Independent
|John Spencer Thompson
|align="right"|132
|align="right"|16.82%
|align="right"|
|align="right"|unknown

|Independent
|George Anthony Boomer Walkem 1
|align="right"|229
|align="right"|29.17%
|align="right"|
|align="right"|unknown
|- bgcolor="white"
!align="right" colspan=3|Total valid votes
!align="right"|785
!align="right"|100.00%
!align="right"|
!align="right"|
|- bgcolor="white"
!align="right" colspan=3|Total rejected ballots
!align="right"|
!align="right"|
!align="right"|
!align="right"|
|- bgcolor="white"
!align="right" colspan=3|Turnout
!align="right"|%
!align="right"|
!align="right"|
!align="right"|
|- bgcolor="white"
!align="right" colspan=7|1Premier 1874-1876
|}

|-

|Independent
|Abraham Barlow
|align="right"|23
|align="right"|9.35%
|align="right"|
|align="right"|unknown

|Independent
|John George Barnston
|align="right"|132
|align="right"|53.66%
|align="right"|
|align="right"|unknown

|Independent
|Edward Pearson
|align="right"|91
|align="right"|36.99%
|align="right"|
|align="right"|unknown
|- bgcolor="white"
!align="right" colspan=3|Total valid votes
!align="right"|n/a
!align="right"| -.- %
!align="right"|
!align="right"|
|- bgcolor="white"
!align="right" colspan=3|Total rejected ballots
!align="right"|
!align="right"|
!align="right"|
!align="right"|
|- bgcolor="white"
!align="right" colspan=3|Turnout
!align="right"|%
!align="right"|
!align="right"|
!align="right"|
|- bgcolor="white"
!align="right" colspan=7|3 Caused by resignation of C. Booth 23 April 1872 upon appointment as Clerk to the Bench at Kootenay 19 April 1872.
|}

|-

|- bgcolor="white"
!align="right" colspan=3|Total valid votes
!align="right"|852
!align="right"|100.00%
!align="right"|
|- bgcolor="white"
!align="right" colspan=3|Total rejected ballots
!align="right"|
!align="right"|
!align="right"|
|- bgcolor="white"
!align="right" colspan=3|Turnout
!align="right"|
!align="right"|
!align="right"|
|- bgcolor="white"
!align="right" colspan=7|4 Incumbent Premier from 1874; term ended in 1876
|}

|-

|- bgcolor="white"
!align="right" colspan=3|Total valid votes
!align="right"|788
!align="right"|100.00%
!align="right"|
|- bgcolor="white"
!align="right" colspan=3|Total rejected ballots
!align="right"|
!align="right"|
!align="right"|
|- bgcolor="white"
!align="right" colspan=3|Turnout
!align="right"|
!align="right"|
!align="right"|
|- bgcolor="white"
!align="right" colspan=6|5 Elected Premier
!align="right"|
!align="right"|
!align="right"|
|}

|-

|- bgcolor="white"
!align="right" colspan=3|Total valid votes
!align="right"|n/a
!align="right"| -.- %
!align="right"|
!align="right"|
|- bgcolor="white"
!align="right" colspan=3|Total rejected ballots
!align="right"|
!align="right"|
!align="right"|
!align="right"|
|- bgcolor="white"
!align="right" colspan=3|Turnout
!align="right"|%
!align="right"|
!align="right"|
!align="right"|
|- bgcolor="white"
!align="right" colspan=7|6 Byelection caused by Walkem's resignation upon appointment to the Executive Council June. Date is that of return of writ, as a polling day was not necessary.
|}

|- bgcolor="white"
!align="right" colspan=3|Total valid votes
!align="right"|228
|- bgcolor="white"
!align="right" colspan=7|7 Cause of byelection was the death of John Evans August.
|}

|-

|Independent
|George Cowan
|align="right"|217
|align="right"|24.46%
|align="right"|
|align="right"|unknown

|- bgcolor="white"
!align="right" colspan=3|Total valid votes
!align="right"|887
!align="right"|100.00%
!align="right"|
|- bgcolor="white"
!align="right" colspan=3|Total rejected ballots
!align="right"|
!align="right"|
!align="right"|
|- bgcolor="white"
!align="right" colspan=3|Turnout
!align="right"|%
!align="right"|
!align="right"|
|}

|-

|Independent
|Samuel Walker
|align="right"|61
|align="right"|8.08%
|align="right"|
|align="right"|unknown

|- bgcolor="white"
!align="right" colspan=3|Total valid votes
!align="right"|755
!align="right"|100.00%
!align="right"|
|- bgcolor="white"
!align="right" colspan=3|Total rejected ballots
!align="right"|
!align="right"|
!align="right"|
|- bgcolor="white"
!align="right" colspan=3|Turnout
!align="right"|%
!align="right"|
!align="right"|
|}

|-

|- bgcolor="white"
!align="right" colspan=3|Total valid votes
!align="right"|642
!align="right"|100.00%
!align="right"|
|- bgcolor="white"
!align="right" colspan=3|Total rejected ballots
!align="right"|
!align="right"|
!align="right"|
|- bgcolor="white"
!align="right" colspan=3|Turnout
!align="right"|%
!align="right"|
!align="right"|
|- bgcolor="white"
!align="right" colspan=7|8 Incumbent Premier since 1889; term ended in 1892
|}

|-

|- bgcolor="white"
!align="right" colspan=3|Total valid votes
!align="right"|689
!align="right"|100.00%
!align="right"|
|- bgcolor="white"
!align="right" colspan=3|Total rejected ballots
!align="right"|
!align="right"|
!align="right"|
|- bgcolor="white"
!align="right" colspan=3|Turnout
!align="right"|%
!align="right"|
!align="right"|
|}

|-

|- bgcolor="white"
!align="right" colspan=3|Total valid votes
!align="right"|758
!align="right"|100.00%
!align="right"|
|- bgcolor="white"
!align="right" colspan=3|Total rejected ballots
!align="right"|
!align="right"|
!align="right"|
|- bgcolor="white"
!align="right" colspan=3|Turnout
!align="right"|%
!align="right"|
!align="right"|
|}

|-

|Conservative
|William Adams
|align="right"|411
|align="right"|23.76%
|align="right"|
|align="right"|unknown

|Liberal
|Harry Jones
|align="right"|439
|align="right"|25.37%
|align="right"|
|align="right"|unknown

|Liberal
|James Murphy
|align="right"|501
|align="right"|28.96%
|align="right"|
|align="right"|unknown

|Conservative
|Samuel Augustus Rogers
|align="right"|379
|align="right"|21.91%
|align="right"|
|align="right"|unknown
|- bgcolor="white"
!align="right" colspan=3|Total valid votes
!align="right"|1,730
!align="right"|100.00%
!align="right"|
|- bgcolor="white"
!align="right" colspan=3|Total rejected ballots
!align="right"|
!align="right"|
!align="right"|
|- bgcolor="white"
!align="right" colspan=3|Turnout
!align="right"|%
!align="right"|
!align="right"|
|}

|-

|Conservative
|Leon Frederick James Champion
|align="right"|135
|align="right"|20.64%
|align="right"|
|align="right"|unknown

|Liberal
|Harry Jones
|align="right"|184
|align="right"|28.14%
|align="right"|
|align="right"|unknown

|Conservative
|Charles Wilson
|align="right"|152
|align="right"|23.34%
|align="right"|
|align="right"|unknown

|Liberal
|John McKay Yorston
|align="right"|183
|align="right"|27.98%
|align="right"|
|align="right"|unknown
|- bgcolor="white"
!align="right" colspan=3|Total valid votes
!align="right"|654
!align="right"|100.00%
!align="right"|
|- bgcolor="white"
!align="right" colspan=3|Total rejected ballots
!align="right"|
!align="right"|
!align="right"|
|- bgcolor="white"
!align="right" colspan=3|Turnout
!align="right"|%
!align="right"|
!align="right"|
|}

|-

|Conservative
|Michael Callanan
|align="right"|273
|align="right"|31.86%
|align="right"|
|align="right"|unknown

|Conservative
|John Anderson Fraser
|align="right"|267
|align="right"|31.15%
|align="right"|
|align="right"|unknown

|- bgcolor="white"
!align="right" colspan=3|Total valid votes
!align="right"|857
!align="right"|100.00%
!align="right"|
|- bgcolor="white"
!align="right" colspan=3|Total rejected ballots
!align="right"|
!align="right"|
!align="right"|
|- bgcolor="white"
!align="right" colspan=3|Turnout
!align="right"|%
!align="right"|
!align="right"|
|}

|-

|Conservative
|Michael Callanan
|align="right"|310
|align="right"|37.48%
|align="right"|
|align="right"|unknown

|Conservative
|John Anderson Fraser
|align="right"|335
|align="right"|40.51%
|align="right"|
|align="right"|unknown

|- bgcolor="white"
!align="right" colspan=3|Total valid votes
!align="right"|827
!align="right"|100.00%
!align="right"|
|- bgcolor="white"
!align="right" colspan=3|Total rejected ballots
!align="right"|
!align="right"|
!align="right"|
|- bgcolor="white"
!align="right" colspan=3|Turnout
!align="right"|%
!align="right"|
!align="right"|
|}

|-

|Conservative
|John Anderson Fraser
|align="right"|207
|align="right"|31.36%
|align="right"|
|align="right"|unknown

|Liberal
|John McKay Yorston
|align="right"|453
|align="right"|68.64%
|align="right"|
|align="right"|unknown
|- bgcolor="white"
!align="right" colspan=3|Total valid votes
!align="right"|660
!align="right"|100.00%
!align="right"|
|- bgcolor="white"
!align="right" colspan=3|Total rejected ballots
!align="right"|
!align="right"|
!align="right"|
|- bgcolor="white"
!align="right" colspan=3|Turnout
!align="right"|%
!align="right"|
!align="right"|
|}

|-

|Conservative
|John Anderson Fraser
|align="right"|349
|align="right"|38.35%
|align="right"|
|align="right"|unknown

|Liberal
|John McKay Yorston
|align="right"|561
|align="right"|61.65%
|align="right"|
|align="right"|unknown
|- bgcolor="white"
!align="right" colspan=3|Total valid votes
!align="right"|910
!align="right"|100.00%
!align="right"|
|- bgcolor="white"
!align="right" colspan=3|Total rejected ballots
!align="right"|
!align="right"|
!align="right"|
|- bgcolor="white"
!align="right" colspan=3|Turnout
!align="right"|%
!align="right"|
!align="right"|
|}

|-

|Conservative
|John Anderson Fraser
|align="right"|397
|align="right"|30.44%
|align="right"|
|align="right"|unknown

|- bgcolor="white"
!align="right" colspan=3|Total valid votes
!align="right"|1,304
!align="right"|100.00%
!align="right"|
|- bgcolor="white"
!align="right" colspan=3|Total rejected ballots
!align="right"|
!align="right"|
!align="right"|
|- bgcolor="white"
!align="right" colspan=3|Turnout
!align="right"|%
!align="right"|
!align="right"|
|}

|-

|Conservative
|Roderick Mackenzie
|align="right"|623
|align="right"|44.00%
|align="right"|
|align="right"|unknown

|Independent
|David Alexander Stoddart
|align="right"|393
|align="right"|27.75%
|align="right"|
|align="right"|unknown
|- bgcolor="white"
!align="right" colspan=3|Total valid votes
!align="right"|1,416
!align="right"|100.00%
!align="right"|
|- bgcolor="white"
!align="right" colspan=3|Total rejected ballots
!align="right"|157
!align="right"|
!align="right"|
|- bgcolor="white"
!align="right" colspan=3|Turnout
!align="right"|%
!align="right"|
!align="right"|
|}

|-

|Co-operative Commonwealth Fed.
|Rupert Williams Haggen
|align="right"|398
|align="right"|19.92%
|align="right"|
|align="right"|unknown

|Liberal
|Donald Morrison MacKay
|align="right"|1,089
|align="right"|54.50%
|align="right"|
|align="right"|unknown

|- bgcolor="white"
!align="right" colspan=3|Total valid votes
!align="right"|1,998
!align="right"|100.00%
!align="right"|
|- bgcolor="white"
!align="right" colspan=3|Total rejected ballots
!align="right"|38
!align="right"|
!align="right"|
|- bgcolor="white"
!align="right" colspan=3|Turnout
!align="right"|%
!align="right"|
!align="right"|
|}

|-

|Independent
|Jennie E. Clarke
|align="right"|655
|align="right"|25.43%
|align="right"|
|align="right"|unknown

|Liberal
|Louis LeBourdais
|align="right"|1,921
|align="right"|74.57%
|align="right"|
|align="right"|unknown
|- bgcolor="white"
!align="right" colspan=3|Total valid votes
!align="right"|2,578
!align="right"|100.00%
!align="right"|
|- bgcolor="white"
!align="right" colspan=3|Total rejected ballots
!align="right"|62
!align="right"|
!align="right"|
|- bgcolor="white"
!align="right" colspan=3|Turnout
!align="right"|%
!align="right"|
!align="right"|
|}

|-

|Co-operative Commonwealth Fed.
|Richmond Charles Biss
|align="right"|338
|align="right"|11.86%
|align="right"|
|align="right"|unknown

|Independent
|Truman Charles Docherty
|align="right"|404
|align="right"|14.18%
|align="right"|
|align="right"|unknown

|Independent
|John Hargreaves
|align="right"|257
|align="right"|9.02%
|align="right"|
|align="right"|unknown

|Liberal
|Louis LeBourdais
|align="right"|1,429
|align="right"|50.16%
|align="right"|
|align="right"|unknown

|Conservative
|Christy McDevitt
|align="right"|257
|align="right"|9.02%
|align="right"|
|align="right"|unknown
|- bgcolor="white"
!align="right" colspan=3|Total valid votes
!align="right"|2,849
!align="right"|100.00%
!align="right"|
|- bgcolor="white"
!align="right" colspan=3|Total rejected ballots
!align="right"|92
!align="right"|
!align="right"|
|- bgcolor="white"
!align="right" colspan=3|Turnout
!align="right"|%
!align="right"|
!align="right"|
|}

|-

|Co-operative Commonwealth Fed.
|Charles Archibald Thomas
|align="right"|995
|align="right"|42.07%
|align="right"|
|align="right"|unknown
|- bgcolor="white"
!align="right" colspan=3|Total valid votes
!align="right"|2,365
!align="right"|100.00%
!align="right"|
|- bgcolor="white"
!align="right" colspan=3|Total rejected ballots
!align="right"|67
!align="right"|
!align="right"|
|- bgcolor="white"
!align="right" colspan=3|Turnout
!align="right"|%
!align="right"|
!align="right"|
|}

|-

|Co-operative Commonwealth
|Nicholas Charles Bird
|align="right"|1,314
|align="right"|33.12%
|align="right"|
|align="right"|unknown

|- bgcolor="white"
!align="right" colspan=3|Total valid votes
!align="right"|3,967
!align="right"|100.00%
!align="right"|
|- bgcolor="white"
!align="right" colspan=3|Total rejected ballots
!align="right"|110
!align="right"|
!align="right"|
|- bgcolor="white"
!align="right" colspan=3|Turnout
!align="right"|%
!align="right"|
!align="right"|
|}

|Liberal
|Angus McLean
|align="right"|1,029
|align="right"|19.88%
|align="right"|1,029
|align="right"|19.88%
|align="right"|
|align="right"|unknown

|Co-operative Commonwealth Fed.
|Roland Riley
|align="right"|689
|align="right"|13.31%
|align="right"|689
|align="right"|13.31%
|align="right"|
|align="right"|unknown

|Progressive Conservative
|Kenneth Winston Thibaudeau
|align="right"|775
|align="right"|14.97%
|align="right"|775
|align="right"|14.97%
|align="right"|
|align="right"|unknown
|- bgcolor="white"
!align="right" colspan=3|Total valid votes
!align="right"|5,177
!align="right"|%
!align="right"|5,177
!align="right"|100.00%
!align="right"|
|- bgcolor="white"
!align="right" colspan=3|Total rejected ballots
!align="right"|216
!align="right"|
!align="right"|
|- bgcolor="white"
!align="right" colspan=3|Turnout
!align="right"|77.94%
!align="right"|
!align="right"|
|- bgcolor="white"
!align="right" colspan=9|9 Preferential ballot; only one count necessary due to majority on first count
|}

|-

|Progressive Conservative
|Jack Gardner Boultbee
|align="right"|509
|align="right"|9.63%
|align="right"|509
|align="right"|9.63%
|align="right"|
|align="right"|unknown

|Liberal
|Gideon Earl Malcolm
|align="right"|1,050
|align="right"|19.87%
|align="right"|1,050
|align="right"|19.87%
|align="right"|
|align="right"|unknown

|Co-operative Commonwealth Fed.
|Joseph Wilson McConnell
|align="right"|992
|align="right"|18.77%
|align="right"|992
|align="right"|18.77%
|align="right"|
|align="right"|unknown
|- bgcolor="white"
!align="right" colspan=3|Total valid votes
!align="right"|5,284
!align="right"|100.00%
!align="right"|5,284
!align="right"|%
!align="right"|
|- bgcolor="white"
!align="right" colspan=3|Total rejected ballots
!align="right"|288
!align="right"|
!align="right"|
!align="right"|
!align="right"|
|- bgcolor="white"
!align="right" colspan=3|Total Registered Voters
!align="right"|
!align="right"|
!align="right"|
!align="right"|
!align="right"|
|- bgcolor="white"
!align="right" colspan=3|Turnout
!align="right"|%
!align="right"|
!align="right"|
!align="right"|
!align="right"|
|- bgcolor="white"
!align="right" colspan=9|10 Preferential ballot; only one count shown due to majority on first count
|}

|-

|Co-operative Commonwealth Fed.
|James Lehman
|align="right"|797
|align="right"|16.09%
|align="right"|
|align="right"|unknown
|- bgcolor="white"
!align="right" colspan=3|Total valid votes
!align="right"|4,952
!align="right"|100.00%
!align="right"|
|- bgcolor="white"
!align="right" colspan=3|Total rejected ballots
!align="right"|45
!align="right"|
!align="right"|
|- bgcolor="white"
!align="right" colspan=3|Turnout
!align="right"|%
!align="right"|
!align="right"|
|}

|-

|Co-operative Commonwealth Fed.
|Stanley Doubleday Crowe
|align="right"|1,842
|align="right"|24.37%
|align="right"|
|align="right"|unknown

|Progressive Conservative
|Celian Orvian Tingley
|align="right"|552
|align="right"|7.30%
|align="right"|
|align="right"|unknown
|- bgcolor="white"
!align="right" colspan=3|Total valid votes
!align="right"|7,558
!align="right"|100.00%
!align="right"|
|- bgcolor="white"
!align="right" colspan=3|Total rejected ballots
!align="right"|112
!align="right"|
!align="right"|
|- bgcolor="white"
!align="right" colspan=3|Turnout
!align="right"|%
!align="right"|
!align="right"|
|}

|-

|Progressive Conservative
|John Alfred Vernon Cade
|align="right"|1,551
|align="right"|21.60%
|align="right"|
|align="right"|unknown

|- bgcolor="white"
!align="right" colspan=3|Total valid votes
!align="right"|7,182
!align="right"|100.00%
!align="right"|
|- bgcolor="white"
!align="right" colspan=3|Total rejected ballots
!align="right"|49
!align="right"|
!align="right"|
|- bgcolor="white"
!align="right" colspan=3|Turnout
!align="right"|%
!align="right"|
!align="right"|
|}

|-

|- bgcolor="white"
!align="right" colspan=3|Total valid votes
!align="right"|7,079
!align="right"|100.00%
!align="right"|
|- bgcolor="white"
!align="right" colspan=3|Total rejected ballots
!align="right"|74
!align="right"|
!align="right"|
|- bgcolor="white"
!align="right" colspan=3|Turnout
!align="right"|%
!align="right"|
!align="right"|
|}

|-

|- bgcolor="white"
!align="right" colspan=3|Total valid votes
!align="right"|11,078
!align="right"|100.00%
!align="right"|
|- bgcolor="white"
!align="right" colspan=3|Total rejected ballots
!align="right"|85
!align="right"|
!align="right"|
|- bgcolor="white"
!align="right" colspan=3|Turnout
!align="right"|%
!align="right"|
!align="right"|
|}

|-

|- bgcolor="white"
!align="right" colspan=3|Total valid votes
!align="right"|14,052
!align="right"|100.00%
!align="right"|
|- bgcolor="white"
!align="right" colspan=3|Total rejected ballots
!align="right"|220
!align="right"|
!align="right"|
|- bgcolor="white"
!align="right" colspan=3|Turnout
!align="right"|%
!align="right"|
!align="right"|
|}

|-

|- bgcolor="white"
!align="right" colspan=3|Total valid votes
!align="right"|20,316
!align="right"|100.00%
!align="right"|
|- bgcolor="white"
!align="right" colspan=3|Total rejected ballots
!align="right"|235
!align="right"|
!align="right"|
|- bgcolor="white"
!align="right" colspan=3|Turnout
!align="right"|%
!align="right"|
!align="right"|
|}

|-

|Independent
|Brian Hartley Mayne
|align="right"|462
|align="right"|2.16%
|align="right"|
|align="right"|unknown
|- bgcolor="white"
!align="right" colspan=3|Total valid votes
!align="right"|21,431
!align="right"|100.00%
!align="right"|
|- bgcolor="white"
!align="right" colspan=3|Total rejected ballots
!align="right"|315
!align="right"|
!align="right"|
|- bgcolor="white"
!align="right" colspan=3|Turnout
!align="right"|%
!align="right"|
!align="right"|
|}

|-

|- bgcolor="white"
!align="right" colspan=3|Total valid votes
!align="right"|26,602
!align="right"|100.00%
!align="right"|
|- bgcolor="white"
!align="right" colspan=3|Total rejected ballots
!align="right"|393
!align="right"|
!align="right"|
|- bgcolor="white"
!align="right" colspan=3|Turnout
!align="right"|%
!align="right"|
!align="right"|
|- bgcolor="white"
!align="right" colspan=7|11 Son of former MLA Louis Lebourdais
|}

|-

|Progressive Conservative
|Peter V. Epp
|align="right"|555
|align="right"|1.15%
|align="right"|
|align="right"|unknown

|Independent
|Jeremie Louis LeBourdais
|align="right"|214
|align="right"|0.44%
|align="right"|
|align="right"|unknown

|Progressive Conservative
|Charles Richard Wyse
|align="right"|778
|align="right"|1.62%
|align="right"|
|align="right"|unknown
|- bgcolor="white"
!align="right" colspan=3|Total valid votes
!align="right"|48,157
!align="right"|100.00%
!align="right"|
|- bgcolor="white"
!align="right" colspan=3|Total rejected ballots
!align="right"|778
!align="right"|
!align="right"|
|- bgcolor="white"
!align="right" colspan=3|Turnout
!align="right"|%
!align="right"|
!align="right"|
|- bgcolor="white"
!align="right" colspan=7|12 Seat increased to two members from one.
|}

Sources
Elections BC website - historical election data

Former provincial electoral districts of British Columbia